James Allen Bertelsen (February 26, 1950 – May 7, 2021) was an American professional football player who was a running back for five seasons in the National Football League (NFL) with the Los Angeles Rams. He played college football for the Texas Longhorns and was a highly regarded high school football player in Wisconsin out of Hudson.

As a sophomore at the University of Texas at Austin in 1969, he helped lead the Longhorns to a national championship in the wishbone option offense, alongside James Street, Steve Worster, and Ted Koy.  As a senior in 1971, Bertlesen was the team's lead ground gainer. In his career at Texas (1969–1971), he rushed for 2,510 yards, averaging 6.1 yards a carry and 33 touchdowns, and also had nine 100-yard rushing games.

Bertelsen was selected in the second round of the 1972 NFL Draft by the Los Angeles Rams with the 30th overall pick. He averaged four yards per carry as a pro, and rushed for 854 yards in 1973. After his NFL career, Bertelsen returned to the Austin area.

He died on May 7, 2021. He was divorced at the time of this death, he had a son, a daughter and a granddaughter.

References

External links
 

1950 births
2021 deaths
American football running backs
Los Angeles Rams players
Texas Longhorns football players
National Conference Pro Bowl players
Players of American football from Saint Paul, Minnesota
People from Hudson, Wisconsin
Players of American football from Wisconsin